Darius Kaiser (born 15 October 1961) is a Polish-born German racing cyclist. He won the German National Road Race in 1989.

Major results
Sources:
1985
 1st Stage 5 Tour de Pologne
1986
 9th Overall Tour de Pologne
1989
 1st  Road race, National Road Championships
 1st Dekra Open Stuttgart Sprint classification
1st Stage 1
 2nd Overall Tour de Luxembourg
1st Mountain classification
1990
 2nd Road race, National Road Championships
 6th Tour du Haut Var
 7th GP Cannes
 10th Overall Dekra Open Stuttgart

References

External links

1961 births
Living people
German male cyclists
Polish male cyclists
People from Tychowo
German cycling road race champions
Sportspeople from West Pomeranian Voivodeship